Epicenter was a rock festival featuring acts on multiple stages started by Danny Wimmer Presents in Southern California where it was sponsored by KROQ.

Continuing in North Carolina, in 2019 Epicenter took the place of the Carolina Rebellion.

Event
{| class="wikitable" width="75%"
|-
! Date
! Location
! colspan="4" | Lineup
|-
| August 22, 2009
|Fairplex – Pomona, California
| colspan="4" | Main stage: Tool, Linkin Park with Dead by Sunrise, Alice in Chains, Wolfmother, Atreyu, Hollywood Undead, Street Sweeper Social Club, DJ "Scratch N Sniff"

Monster Energy stage: Atmosphere, Aesop Rock, Paper Tongues, Sonny, After Midnight Project
|-
| September 25–26, 2010
|Auto Club Speedway – Fontana, California
| colspan="2" | Day 1

Main stage: Kiss, Eminem, Bush, Papa Roach, Big Boi, Crash Kings, Deuce (formerly of Hollywood Undead)

Monster Energy stage: House of Pain, Big B with Scott Russo (from Unwritten Law), The Knux, Smile Empty Soul, Kinda Major, The Envy

VIP stage: DMX
| colspan="2" |Day 2

Main stage: Blink-182, Rise Against, Thirty Seconds to Mars, Bad Religion, Against Me!, A Day to Remember, The Academy Is...

Monster Energy stage: Suicidal Tendencies, The Black Pacific, New Politics, Black Veil Brides, Biffy Clyro
|-
| September 24, 2011
|Verizon Wireless Amphitheater – Irvine, California
| colspan="4" |Limp Bizkit, Staind, Papa Roach, Five Finger Death Punch, Everlast, Buckcherry, Puddle of Mudd, P.O.D., Skillet, Crossfade, Red, Asking Alexandria, Redlight King, Middle Class Rut, Drive A
|-
| September 22, 2012
|Verizon Wireless Amphitheater – Irvine, California
| colspan="4" |Stone Temple Pilots, Deftones, Bush, Scars on Broadway, Chevelle, Hollywood Undead, Escape the Fate, Dead Sara, Crash Kings, Hyro Da Hero, Beware of Darkness
|-
| September 21, 2013
|Verizon Wireless Amphitheater – Irvine, California
| colspan="4" |The Offspring, A Day to Remember, Bad Religion, Pennywise, Pierce the Veil, All Time Low, Falling in Reverse, The Wonder Years, Fidlar, New Beat Fund, Plague Vendor
|-
| March 14, 2015
|The Forum, – Inglewood, California
| colspan="4" |Korn, Limp Bizkit, House of Pain, P.O.D., Suicidal Tendencies, Hopsin
|-
| May 10–12, 2019
|Rockingham Speedway - Rockingham, North Carolina
|
Day 1

Korn, Rob Zombie, The Prodigy, Evanescence, Machine Gun Kelly, Meshuggah, Skillet, Beartooth, Mark Lanegan Band, Dorothy, Black Pistol Fire, Zeal & Ardor, Knocked Loose, Slothrust, Wilson, Hands Like Houses, Hyro the Hero, Amigo the Devil, Ded, Arrested Youth, Vein, Black Coffee
| colspan="2" |
Day 2

Tool, Judas Priest, The Cult, Bush, Black Label Society, Circa Survive, Yelawolf, Motionless in White, The Damned Things, Grandson, Badflower, Memphis May Fire, Light the Torch, Wage War, Crobot, Dead Girls Academy, Sylar, Counterfeit, Pretty Vicious, Shvpes, Dirty Honey, Alien Weaponry, Hyde, Tetrarch
|
Day 3

Foo Fighters, Bring Me the Horizon, 311, Live, Mastodon, Killswitch Engage, Architects, The Interrupters, Tom Morello, Fever 333, Reignwolf, Yungblud, The Glorious Sons, Ho99o9, While She Sleeps, Basement, Scarlxrd, Movements, Teenage Wrist, Demob Happy, Boston Manor, Cleopatrick, The Dirty Nil

References

External links
 

Heavy metal festivals in the United States
KROQ-FM
Music festivals established in 2009
Music festivals in North Carolina
Rock festivals in the United States